Salisbury Plantation may refer to:
 Salisbury Plantation (Westover, Maryland), listed on the NRHP in Maryland
Salisbury Plantation (Woodville, Mississippi), listed on the NRHP in Mississippi
Salisbury (Chesterfield County, Virginia), a former 18th century plantation near Richmond, Virginia

See also
Salisbury House (disambiguation)